The Calaveras County Arts Council is the official Calaveras County, California, USA arts council.

Mission: "To Support, Nourish and Awaken the Arts in our Community."

The Calaveras County Arts Council runs under the California state arts council, the California Arts Council (CAC).

Arts Council Gallery

The Calaveras County Arts Council runs an art gallery open to the public.

External links
Calaveras County Arts Council website

Arts councils of California
Calaveras County, California